Syv dage for Elisabeth (Seven Days for Elizabeth) is a Norwegian silent film comedy from 1927 directed by Leif Sinding. The screenplay was written by Sinding and Arvid Skappel, and it was based on Skappel's novella Påskeflirt. Sonja Henie played a bit part in the film. The censors removed a closeup of a female dancer, the text Jeg vil, men først vi je ha dig sel 'I want to, but first I want you myself', and a brawl scene.

Plot
The young hairdresser Elisabeth Borg wins first prize in a lottery and decides to spend Easter at a resort in the mountains. She and her friend Lucie spend some luxurious days there. The scoundrel Franz Markel tries some mischief against Elisabeth, but he is revealed by the millionaire's son Rolf Heller, who gives the villain his just deserts. Rolf and Elisabeth are engaged, and on top of that Elisabeth finds her father, Consul Heie, whom she did not know before.

Cast

 Magda Holm as Elisabeth Borg 
 Haakon Hjelde as Rolf Heller 
 Ellen Sinding as Lucie Breien 
 Hilda Fredriksen a Henriette Kaspar 
 Ragnvald Wingar as Joachim Jensen, a colporteur 
 Emmy Worm-Müller as Josefine Hansen, the foster mother
 Ulf Selmer as Frantz Markel 
 Per Kvist as Gunnar Erlind, a lecturer
 Rolf Knudssøn as Jan Drescher von Crongreen 
 David Knudsen as Thomas Heie, a consul
 Henry Gleditsch as Morten Gribb, a journalist 
 Harriet Paulsen as Kathleen Wilson 
 Arne Svendsen as Vaaler, a director 
 Bergljot Vedène as Madam Carena, a Russian ballerina 
 Sverre Arnesen as a poker player 
 Lizzie Florelius as Anna Palme 
 Arthur Barking as the hotel concierge 
 Kaare Knudsen as Knut, a mountain guide 
 Sonja Henie as a young speed skater

References

External links
 
 Syv dage for Elisabeth at the National Library of Norway

1927 films
Norwegian silent films
Norwegian black-and-white films
Norwegian comedy films
Films based on books
1927 comedy films
Films directed by Leif Sinding